Melody Beattie (born on July 2, 1948) is an American author of self-help books on codependent relationships.

Education and career 
Born Melody Vaillancourt in Minneapolis, Beattie graduated from high school with honors. She began drinking at age 12, was an alcoholic by age 13, and a drug addict by 18.

Beattie published 18 books including Codependent No More, Beyond Codependency, The Language of Letting Go and Make Miracles in Forty Days: Turning What You Have into What You Want, published in 2010. Several of her books have been published in other languages.

Ideas
Beattie, along with Janet G. Woititz and Robin Norwood, were popularizers of science, helping to digest and explain the work of psychiatrist Timmen L. Cermak, author of Diagnosing and Treating Co-Dependence. Beattie popularized the concept of codependency in 1986 with Codependent No More, which sold eight million copies.

Codependent No More was first published by the Hazelden Foundation

Beattie's early works also served as the first the Big Book for a 12-Step program called Co-Dependents Anonymous. Although "CoDA" now has a conference-approved (official) '"the Big Book" of its own, Beattie's works continue to be central texts in some CoDA meetings.

References

External links 
 

1948 births
Codependency
Living people
Self-help writers
Writers from Saint Paul, Minnesota